This is a list of mountain ranges in the state of Montana. Montana is the fourth largest state in the United States and is well known for its mountains. The name "Montana" means "mountainous" in Latin. Representative James Mitchell Ashley (R-Ohio), suggested the name when legislation organizing the territory was passed by the United States Congress in 1864. Ashley noted that a mining camp in the Colorado Territory had already used the name, and Congress agreed to use the name for the new territory.

According to the United States Board on Geographic Names, there are at least 100 named mountain ranges and sub-ranges in Montana. However, mountain ranges have no official boundaries, and there is no official list of mountain ranges in the state.

List of mountain ranges

The mountain ranges below are listed by name, county, coordinates, and average elevation as recorded by the U.S. Geological Survey. Sub-ranges are indented below the name of the primary range. Some of these ranges extend into Wyoming, Idaho, and Canada.

 Absaroka Range; Park County, Montana; ; 
 Anaconda Range; Deer Lodge County, Montana; ; 
 Badger Hills; Big Horn County, Montana; ; 
 Bears Paw Mountains; Blaine & Hill County, Montana; ; 
 Beartooth Mountains; Park County, Montana; ; 
 Beaverhead Mountains; Lemhi County, Idaho; 

; 
 Big Belt Mountains Broadwater County, Montana; ; 
 Big Horn Mountains; Big Horn County, Montana; ; 
 Big Sheep Mountains; Dawson County, Montana; ; 
 Big Snowy Mountains; Fergus County, Montana; ; 
 Bitterroot Range; Clearwater County, Idaho; ; 
 Bitterroot Mountains; Mineral County, Montana; ; 
 Grave Creek Range;    Missoula County, Montana; ; 
 Black Reef; Lewis and Clark County, Montana; ; 
 Boulder Hills;  Jefferson County, Montana; ; 
 Boulder Mountains;  Deer Lodge County, Montana; ; 

 Bridger Range; Gallatin County, Montana; ; 
 Bull Mountains;  Musselshell County, Montana; ; 
 Butcher Hills; Carter County, Montana; ; 
 Cabinet Mountains; Sanders County, Montana; ; 
 Calderwood Hills;  Valley County, Montana; ; 
 Castle Mountains; Meagher County, Montana; ; 
 Cayuse Hills; Sweet Grass County, Montana; ; 
 Centennial Mountains;  Clark County, Idaho; ; 
 Eastern Centennial Mountains;   Clark County, Idaho; ; 
 Western Centennial Mountains; Clark County, Idaho;  ; 
 Chalk Buttes; Carter County, Montana; ; 

 Coeur d'Alene Mountains; Sanders County, Montana; ; 
 Crazy Mountains; Park County, Montana; ; 
 Dahl Hills; Valley County, Montana; ; 
 Dickie Hills; Silver Bow County, Montana; ; 
 Dry Range; Meagher County, Montana; ; 
 Ekalaka Hills; Carter County, Montana; ; 
 Elkhorn Mountains; Jefferson County, Montana; ; 
 Flathead Alps; Powell County, Montana; ; 
 Flathead Range; Flathead County, Montana; ; 
 Flattops; Carter County, Montana; ; 
 Flint Creek Range; Granite County, Montana; ; 
 Franklin Hills;   Sweet Grass County, Montana; ; 
 Gallatin Range; Gallatin County, Montana; ; 
 Gallatin Range;  Park County, Wyoming; ; 
 Garnet Range; Powell County, Montana; ; 
 Granite Range;    Stillwater County, Montana; ; 
 Gravelly Range;    Madison County, Montana; ; 
 Greenhorn Range;    Madison County, Montana; ; 
 Henrys Lake Mountains;  Madison County, Montana; ; 
 Highland Mountains; Madison County, Montana; ; 
 Highwood Mountains   Chouteau County, Montana; ; 
 Honeycomb Hills; Powder River County, Montana; ; 
 Horn Mountains;   Madison County, Montana; ; 
 Horseshoe Hills; Gallatin County, Montana; ; 
 Humbolt Hills; Carter County, Montana; ; 
 John Long Mountains;   Granite County, Montana; ; 

 Judith Mountains;   Fergus County, Montana; ; 
 Larb Hills;    Phillips County, Montana; ; 
 Lewis Range;    Glacier County, Montana; ; 
 Lewis and Clark Range;   Powell County, Montana; ; 
 Limestone Hills;    Broadwater County, Montana; ; 
 Little Belt Mountains;    Meagher County, Montana; ; 
 Little Rocky Mountains;    Blaine County, Montana; ; 
 Little Snowy Mountains;    Fergus County, Montana; ; 
 Little Wolf Mountains;    Big Horn County, Montana; ; 
 Livingston Range;    Glacier County, Montana; ; 
 Long Pines;   Carter County, Montana; ; 
 Madison Range;    Madison County, Montana; ; 
 Spanish Peaks; Madison County, Montana; ; 
 The Wedge; Madison County, Montana; ; 
 Milk River Hills;    McCone County, Montana; ; 
 Mission Range;    Lake County, Montana; ; 
 North Hills;   Missoula County, Montana; ; 
 North Moccasin Mountains; Fergus County, Montana; ; 
 Opheim Hills;   Valley County, Montana; ; 
 Papoose Hills;   Valley County, Montana; ; 
 Park Hills;    Meagher County, Montana; ; 
 Pike Creek Hills;   Petroleum County, Montana; ; 
 Piney Buttes;   Garfield County, Montana; ; 
 Pioneer Mountains; Beaverhead County, Montana; ; 
 Pryor Mountains   Big Horn County, Montana and Carbon County, Montana; ; 
 Purcell Mountains;   Lincoln County, Montana; ; 
 Rattlesnake Mountains (Montana); Lake County, Montana and Missoula County, Montana; ; 
 Rocky Hills; Beaverhead County, Montana; ; 
 Ruby Range; Madison County, Montana; ; 
 Salish Mountains; Lincoln County, Montana; ; 
 Sapphire Mountains   Ravalli County, Montana; ; 
 Sawtooth Range;   Teton County, Montana; ; 
 Smoky Range; Flathead County, Montana; ; 
 Snowcrest Range; Madison County, Montana; ; 
 South Hills;   Missoula County, Montana; ; 
 South Moccasin Mountains; Fergus County, Montana; ; 
 Spear Hills;   Powder River County, Montana; ; 
 Spokane Hills;   Lewis and Clark County, Montana; ; 
 Swan Range; Flathead County, Montana; ; 
 Sweet Grass Hills; Liberty County, Montana and Toole County, Montana; ; 
 Taylor Hills; Carter County, Montana; ; 
 Tendoy Mountains; Beaverhead County, Montana; ; 
 The Pine Hills; Custer County, Montana; ; 
 The Pinnacles; Cascade County, Montana; ; 
 Thoeny Hills;   Phillips County, Montana; ; 
 Three Buttes; Blaine County, Montana; ; 
 Tobacco Root Mountains   Madison County, Montana; ; 
 Whitefish Range; Flathead County, Montana; ; 
 Wilson Range; Glacier County, Montana; ; 
 Wolf Mountains; Big Horn County, Montana; ;

See also
 Mountains and mountain ranges of Glacier National Park (U.S.)
 Mountains and mountain ranges of Yellowstone National Park
 List of mountains in Montana
 Mountain passes in Montana (A-L)
 Mountain passes in Montana (M-Z)

Further reading

Notes

 
Montana, List of mountain ranges of
Ranges
Montana